USS New Hampshire (SSN-778), a Virginia-class nuclear-powered attack submarine, is the fourth vessel of the United States Navy to be named for the state of New Hampshire. She is the first of the Virginia-class Block-II submarines to enter service. Her name was awarded to the submarine after a letter-writing campaign by the third-graders from Garrison Elementary School and sixth graders from Dover Middle School in Dover to their members of Congress, the state governor, and the Secretary of the Navy.

History
The contract to build her was awarded to the Electric Boat Division of General Dynamics Corporation in Groton, Connecticut, on 14 August 2003.  Construction began in January 2004.<ref>{{Navsource|08/08778|New Hampshire (SSN-778) }}</ref> A keel-laying ceremony for the submarine was held at Electric Boat's Quonset Point facility in North Kingstown, Rhode Island, on 30 April 2007.
Sponsor
The ship's sponsor was Cheryl McGuinness of Portsmouth, New Hampshire, the widow of Thomas McGuinness, co-pilot of American Airlines Flight 11, who died in the September 11, 2001 attacks when the jet was flown into the North Tower of the World Trade Center.
Launched
The submarine was launched on 21 February 2008 and christened four months later, on 21 June 2008 in Groton, Connecticut, eight months ahead of schedule and $54 million under budget.Atlanta Journal-Constitution, "Thousands Mark New Navy Sub", 22 June 2008. New Hampshire finished sea trials and was delivered to the Navy on 28 August 2008. The boat was commissioned in a ceremony at the Portsmouth Naval Shipyard in Kittery, Maine, on 25 October 2008.

Although she is the fourth vessel to carry this name, one of her predecessors, was authorized but cancelled before keel laying.

 Equipment failure while on deployment 

During the week of 13 March 2011, while on a mission under the Arctic ice cap, New Hampshire'' suffered an oxygen generator failure. This failure required the submarine to surface through the ice. The crew had used oxygen candles to make oxygen until the boat surfaced. United Technologies, the company responsible for building the oxygen generator, dispatched a representative with needed replacement parts to the submarine by way of a temporary ice camp, to assist the crew in repairing the problem.

References

External links 

  Navsource.org: USS New Hampshire

 

Virginia-class submarines
Nuclear submarines of the United States Navy
Ships built in Groton, Connecticut
2008 ships
Submarines of the United States